Palladino is an Italian surname. Notable people with the surname include:

 Adriano Palladino (1610–1680), Italian painter of the Baroque era
 Aleksa Palladino (born 1980), American actress and singer
 Amy Sherman-Palladino, American television writer and producer
 Daniel Palladino, American television writer and producer
 Eddie Palladino, American basketball announcer for the Boston Celtics
 Emma Palladino (c1860-1922), London-based Italian ballerina
 Erik Palladino (born 1968), American actor
 Eusapia Palladino (1854–1918), Italian spiritualist and medium
 Jack Palladino, American private investigator hired by the Bill Clinton presidential election committee
 Leandro Palladino (born 1976), retired Argentine-Italian professional basketball player
 Pino Palladino (born 1957), Welsh rock and rhythm & blues bass player
 Raffaele Palladino (born 1984), Italian professional football player
 Robert Palladino (1932–2016), American academic
 David Gerald Palladino-Sinclair (born 1968), American musician, Arranger, Music Critic, Pipe Major Rampant Lion Pipe Band
 Tony Palladino (born 1983), English professional cricketer

See also 
 Paladino (disambiguation)

Italian-language surnames